Agnes Parsons (born Jenny Parsons) was an American screenwriter active during Hollywood's silent era. She also taught and wrote about writing after she stopped writing for the silver screen.

Biography 
Agnes was born in Burlington, Iowa, to William Parsons and Grace Priddy. She moved to Oregon as a young woman before moving to Los Angeles. By 1917, she was working as a scenario writer for Cecil B. deMille's studio, although she wasn't credited on her earliest scripts. Her first known credit was on 1920's The Crucifix of Destiny. After she stopped writing screenplays in the early 1930s, she worked as a teacher. Agnes died on December 7, 1970, in Los Angeles.

Selected filmography 

 Jewels of Desire (1927)
 Josselyn's Wife (1926)
 Wreckage (1925)
 Vengeance of the Deep (1923)
 The Fast Mail (1922)
 Chain Lightning (1922)
 Riding with Death (1921)
 Rip Van Winkle (1921)
 The Crucifix of Destiny (1920)

References 

American screenwriters
American women screenwriters
Screenwriters from Iowa
People from Burlington, Iowa
1884 births
1970 deaths
20th-century American screenwriters
20th-century American women